Erlend Dahl Reitan (born 11 September 1997) is a Norwegian professional footballer who plays as a right back for Rosenborg.

Club career

Rosenborg
Reitan is an academy graduate of Rosenborg. During his development with the club's junior sides he was deployed mainly as a winger before being converted to the right-back position following his promotion to the senior side. He made his non-competitive debut for Rosenborg on 27 March 2015 in a friendly match against Kristiansund, before making his competitive debut the following year, starting in  a 5-1 win over Byåsen in the NM Cup on 27 April 2016. Having made a handful of cup appearances for the senior team, Reitan returned to the youth side and was part of the squad which beat Verdal 12-0 in a Championship match in June, scoring the second goal of the match in the process.

Reitan made his Tippeligaen debut on 18 September 2016 and scored from the penalty spot in a 2–0 win over Start. He scored again after just four minutes in his next appearance in a 3–1 win over Vålerenga and ended the season with two goals in four appearances. He made only one further appearance the following year before being loaned out to first division side Bodø/Glimt.

Loan to Bodø/Glimt
On 12 July 2017, Reitan officially joined Bodø/Glimt on loan for the remainder of the season. During his time at the club, he scored twice in 13 appearances before returning to Rosenborg, where he signed a new three-year contract.

Career statistics

Club

1 Includes Norwegian Super Cup matches.

Honours

Club

Rosenborg
Norwegian League (2): 2016, 2018
Norwegian Football Cup (2): 2016, 2018
Norwegian U-19 Championship (1): 2015
Norwegian U-16 Championship (1): 2013
Norwegian Super Cup (1): 2018

References

External links
 
 

1997 births
Living people
Norwegian footballers
Association football defenders
Rosenborg BK players
FK Bodø/Glimt players
Eliteserien players
Norwegian First Division players